Pramathanath Banerjee  was an Indian politician. He was elected to the Lok Sabha, the lower house of Indian Parliament from Contai constituency, West Bengal  as a member of the Praja Socialist Party.

Early life and education 
He was educated at the Calcutta University.

Career 
He joined the non-cooperation movement and was imprisoned.

Member of Parliament 
He was elected to the second Lok Sabha from Contai.

References

External links
Official biographical sketch in Parliament of India website

Year of birth missing
Year of death missing
India MPs 1957–1962
Praja Socialist Party politicians
Lok Sabha members from West Bengal
1885 births